East Devon District Council is the local authority for East Devon in England. The council is elected every four years. Sixty councillors are elected from 30 wards since the last boundary changes in 2019.

Political control
The first election to the council was held in 1973, initially operating as a shadow authority before coming into its powers on 1 April 1974. Political control of the council since 1973 has been held by the following parties:

Leadership
The leaders of the council since 2001 have been:

Council elections
1973 East Devon District Council election
1976 East Devon District Council election
1979 East Devon District Council election (New ward boundaries)
1980 East Devon District Council election
1982 East Devon District Council election
1983 East Devon District Council election
1984 East Devon District Council election
1986 East Devon District Council election
1987 East Devon District Council election
1991 East Devon District Council election (District boundary changes took place but the number of seats remained the same)
1995 East Devon District Council election
1999 East Devon District Council election
2003 East Devon District Council election (New ward boundaries reduced the number of seats by 1)
2007 East Devon District Council election
2011 East Devon District Council election
2015 East Devon District Council election
2019 East Devon District Council election

By-election results

1995-1999

1999-2003

2003-2007

2007-2011

2019-2023

References 

By-election results

External links
East Devon District Council

 
East Devon District
Council elections in Devon
District council elections in England